The 2nd Qatari Stars Cup started on 18 November 2010.

The Stars Cup is one of four competitions in the 2010–11 Qatari football season. 12 clubs are taking part in the tournament.

They were divided into two groups of six teams, with the winner and runner-up of each group will advancing to the semi-finals.

Group stage

Group A

Group B

Semi-finals

Final

Champions

Statistics

Top goalscorers 

Qatari Stars Cup
Football competitions in Qatar
2010–11 in Qatari football